In Greek mythology, Anteros (Ancient Greek: Ἀντέρως Antérōs) was the god of requited love (literally "love returned" or "counter-love") and also the punisher of those who scorn love and the advances of others, or the avenger of unrequited love. He is one of the Erotes.

Myth
Anteros was the son of Ares and Aphrodite in Greek mythology, given as a playmate to his brother Eros, who was lonely – the rationale being that love must be answered if it is to prosper. Alternatively, he was said to have arisen from the mutual love between Poseidon and Nerites. Physically, he is depicted as similar to Eros in every way, but with long hair and plumed butterfly wings. He has been described also as armed with either a golden club or arrows of lead.

Anteros, with Eros, was one of a host of winged love gods called Erotes, the ever-youthful winged gods of love, usually depicted as winged boys in the company of Aphrodite or her attendant goddesses. According to Porphyrius, Aphrodite once complained to Themis that Eros remained a perpetual child, so Themis advised her to give him a brother. Aphrodite then gave birth to Anteros, and whenever he was near Eros, Eros grew. But if Anteros was away, Eros shrank back to his previous, smaller size.

An altar to Anteros was put up by the metics in Athens in commemoration of the spurned love of the metic , who was rejected by the Athenian Meles. Upon hearing Timagoras' declaration of love for him, the young man mockingly ordered him to throw himself down from the top of a tall rock. Seeing Timagoras dead, Meles repented and threw himself down from the same rock.

Describing the nature of the emotion, Plato asserts that it is the result of the great love for another person. The lover, inspired by beauty, is filled with divine love and "filling the soul of the loved one with love in return." As a result, the loved one falls in love with the lover, though the love is only spoken of as friendship. They experience pain when the two are apart, and relief when they are together, the mirror image of the lover's feelings, is anteros, or "counter-love".

Legacy
Anteros is the subject of the Shaftesbury Memorial Fountain in Piccadilly Circus, London, where he symbolises the selfless philanthropic love of the Earl of Shaftesbury for the poor. The memorial is sometimes given the name The Angel of Christian Charity and is popularly mistaken for Eros.

References

Further reading
 

Love and lust gods
Greek love and lust deities
Greek gods
Children of Aphrodite
Children of Ares
LGBT themes in Greek mythology
Children of Poseidon
Avian humanoids
Personifications in Greek mythology
Erotes
Olympian deities
Deeds of Eros